Roanoke Rapids High School is a public high school in Roanoke Rapids, North Carolina.

Building history
Roanoke Rapids High School opened in 1921. It was the brainchild of local industrialist Samuel Paterson and was intended to be the centerpiece of the entire Roanoke Rapids community. The school was designed by Hobart Upjohn and cost ten times the average high school building in the state. It is in the Tudor Revival or Gothic style and draws qualities of the Universities of Cambridge and Oxford in the United Kingdom.  It is a 3 1/2-story, nine bay, "T"-shaped building with a combination flat-top and slate gable roof and a projecting, crenellated entrance tower.

It was listed on the National Register of Historic Places in 1988.

Athletics
The school's colors are black and gold. Its mascot is the Yellow Jacket. The school uses a logo similar to that of Georgia Tech. The Yellow Jackets were the Class B, Baseball State Champions in 1932 and 1935. Roanoke Rapids High School competes in the North Carolina High School Athletic Association in the 2A class. They have football, baseball, softball, swimming, wrestling, volleyball, track and field, cross country, soccer, basketball, tennis, golf, and cheerleading programs.

Notable alumni
 Brian Barnes, MLB pitcher
 Nazair Jones, NFL player
 Meredith Kinleigh, Christian pop musician
 Kareem Martin, NFL player
 Tom Topping, college football player, inducted into Duke Sports Hall of Fame

References

External links
Roanoke Rapids High School page at the Roanoke Rapids Graded School District site
Roanoke Rapids High School Alumni and Friends
Guide to the Hobart Upjohn Architectural Drawings of the Roanoke Rapids Senior High School 1920-1938

Public high schools in North Carolina
Schools in Halifax County, North Carolina
School buildings on the National Register of Historic Places in North Carolina
Tudor Revival architecture in North Carolina
School buildings completed in 1921
National Register of Historic Places in Halifax County, North Carolina
1921 establishments in North Carolina
Individually listed contributing properties to historic districts on the National Register in North Carolina